Nigeria Union of Journalists (NUJ) is a network of media professionals established to advance the safety and welfare of Nigerian journalists. It is an independent trade organisation with no political leaning or ideological disposition. NUJ is founded in the underlying belief that speaking with one voice as a professional body it can push for the interest of its members particularly in the areas of working conditions and rights: freedom of expression, safety, job security and fair remuneration, gender equality, freedom of association, copyright protection and fight against all forms of discrimination and suppression. NUJ organises and supports campaigns aimed at protecting the journalists’ rights and strengthening collective agreements.

NUJ was founded on 15 March 1955 in Lagos during the Nigeria's struggle for independence from British rule.  It is affiliated to the Nigeria Labour Congress.  Its membership grew from 3,950 in 1988 to 35,000 in 2005.

References 

Trade unions established in 1955
Freedom of expression organizations
Journalists' trade unions
1955 establishments in Nigeria
Trade unions in Nigeria